"Stay" is a song performed by British drum and bass duo Sigma. The song was released as a digital download on 18 March 2016, through 3 Beat Records as the eighth and final single from their debut studio album Life (2015). The song peaked at number 117 on the UK Singles Chart. The song was written by Sigma, Carl Ryden, Paul Harris and Elizabeth Paige.

Music video
The music video features South African models Liv de Klerk and Nicole Naude, who also starred in the video for Sigma's 2014 single "Nobody to Love".

Track listing

Charts

Release history

References

2015 songs
2016 singles
Sigma songs
Songs written by Carl Ryden